Bleuchâtel is a Swiss blue cheese produced from pasteurized cow's milk in Les Ponts-de-Martel in Switzerland. Its name comes from bleu (blue in French) and Neuchâtel.

See also
 Cheeses of Switzerland
 Blue cheese

References

Blue cheeses
Swiss cheeses